Menachem 'Miko' Bello (born December 26, 1947) is a former Israeli football defender, who played for the Israel national team between 1965 and 1975. He was part of the Israel squad for the 1970 World Cup.

At club level, Bello played solely for Maccabi Tel Aviv

External links
 
 

1947 births
Israeli Jews
Living people
Israeli footballers
Association football defenders
Israel international footballers
Maccabi Tel Aviv F.C. players
1968 AFC Asian Cup players
1970 FIFA World Cup players
Olympic footballers of Israel
Footballers at the 1968 Summer Olympics
Footballers from Tel Aviv